Allan Rucker Bosworth (October 29, 1901 – July 18, 1986) was an American author, newspaperman, and naval officer. He was a prolific writer of novels, short stories and magazine articles. Between 1925 and 1936 he worked at several California newspapers as a reporter and editor. He also served in the United States Navy and Navy Reserve for some 38 years.

Bosworth also wrote under the pseudonym Alamo Boyd.

Biography

He was born in San Angelo, Texas, worked as a journalist in San Francisco, and served in Japan as a Naval public relations officer. He travelled extensively in Europe and the Far East, and lived in Roanoke, Virginia for most of his life. He wrote several novels and short stories in the Western fiction genre. His son Allan Bernard Bosworth is also a writer.

Books

 (Paperback reprint of Full Crash Dive)

Notes

References

External links
  (previous page of browse report under 'Bosworth, Allan R. (Allan Rucker), 1901–')
 Alamo Boyd at LC Authorities, no records, and one work at WorldCat: 

1901 births
1986 deaths
American male novelists
American Western (genre) novelists
United States Navy officers
20th-century American novelists
20th-century American male writers
People from San Angelo, Texas
Writers from Roanoke, Virginia
Novelists from Texas
Novelists from Virginia
Military personnel from Texas
United States Navy personnel of World War II
American expatriates in Japan